The Party Founding Museum is a museum located in the Central District of Pyongyang, North Korea, on the south side of Mt. Haebang The building was constructed by the Japanese occupation government in 1923. It was used as the South P'yŏngan Provincial Products Exhibition.  Thus, in October 1970 it was turned into a museum dedicated to his exploits. Nearby, and also part of the museum, is the modest house he inhabited during his early days as president of North Korea.

History 
The original building was built in 1923 by the Japanese occupation government. After his return to Korea after World War II, Kim Il-sung is alleged to have founded the Korean Workers' Party in this building on October 10, 1945, and here were held many of that group's first meetings. During the Korean War, the building was destroyed. The museum opened in October 1970.

Layout 
The building's architecture is of the typical Japanese colonial style; it is blocky and formal, and built out of dark gray stone. The roof of the building is modeled after the Imperial Diet Building in Tokyo.

The first floor features an exhibition of photos and artifacts, while the second floor is preserved in its original historic appearance.

See also 

 List of museums in North Korea
 Party Foundation Day
 Monument to Party Founding

Notes

References

External links
Party Founding Museum picture album at Naenara

Buildings and structures completed in 1923
Museums in Pyongyang
Buildings and structures in Pyongyang
1970 establishments in North Korea
Museums established in 1970
20th-century architecture in Korea